Qi was a kingdom during the Five Dynasties and Ten Kingdoms period in Chinese history. The kingdom, at its prime, covered parts of modern-day Gansu, Shaanxi, and Sichuan provinces, but eventually shrank to only the immediate area around its capital Fengxiang in Shaanxi. Its only ruler was Li Maozhen, who later submitted to Later Tang.  (After Li Maozhen's death in 924, his son Li Congyan would continue to govern Fengxiang until 926, when he was removed by the Later Tang's emperor Li Cunxu, although he would serve three later stints as governor of Fengxiang.)

References 

 
Former countries in Chinese history